"Forever" is a song written by Jimmy Fortune, and recorded by American country music group The Statler Brothers.  It was released in November 1986 as the third single from their album Four for the Show.  The song peaked at number 7 on the Billboard Hot Country Singles chart.

Chart performance

References

1986 singles
1986 songs
The Statler Brothers songs
Mercury Records singles
Songs written by Jimmy Fortune
Song recordings produced by Jerry Kennedy